The Pakistan national cricket team toured New Zealand in January and February 1985 and played a three-match Test series and four One Day International (ODI) matches against the New Zealand national cricket team. New Zealand won the series 2–0 and New Zealand won the ODI series 3–0. New Zealand were captained by Geoff Howarth and Pakistan by Javed Miandad. This was New Zealand's last Test series win against Pakistan until November 2016.

Test series summary

First Test

Second Test

Third Test

One Day Internationals (ODIs)

New Zealand won the Rothmans Cup 3-0, with 1 no result.

1st ODI

2nd ODI

3rd ODI

4th ODI

References

External links
 Series home at ESPN Cricinfo

1985 in Pakistani cricket
1985 in New Zealand cricket
International cricket competitions from 1980–81 to 1985
New Zealand cricket seasons from 1970–71 to 1999–2000
1985